Daniil Aleksandrovich Samsonov (born 13 July 2005) is a Russian figure skater, who formerly held three junior world records for men's skating.

He is the 2020 Youth Olympic bronze medalist, the 2019 Junior Grand Prix Final bronze medalist, the 2019 JGP Poland champion, the 2019 Winter Children of Asia International Sports Games champion, and a two-time Russian junior national champion (2019, 2020).

Career 
He was born in Moscow, Russia. Daniil Samsonov formerly trained under Alexander Shubin at Moskvich, and has been training under Eteri Tutberidze at Sambo 70 since the start of the 2015/2016 season.

2018–2019 season 
In early February 2019, Samsonov won the Russian Junior Figure Skating Championships.  "[The boy] skated breathtakingly. At such an [early] age, to jump a quadruple Lutz, so beautifully, so easily, that had never happened before in the world," Tatiana Tarasova said of his victory.  Samsonov was not sent to the 2019 World Junior Championships because he would not be age eligible to compete at junior level internationally until the following (2019/2020) season; his thirteenth birthday was July 13, twelve days past the July 1 cutoff.

A few days later, he was one of the skaters who represented Russia in Sakhalin at the first Children of Asia Games, winning the gold medal.

2019–2020 season 
In early September 2019, Samsonov made his ISU Junior Grand Prix debut at the 2019 JGP event in Riga, Latvia, where he won the bronze medal. He ranked fourth in the short program and third in the free skate and scored his personal best score of 211.62 points. Two weeks later, he competed at this second JGP event of the season in Gdańsk, Poland, where he won his first JGP gold medal. At this competition, he set the new world record scores for the short program (87.33 points), free skate (163.18 points) and the combined total (250.51 points). Ranked first in both the short program and the free skate, he outscored the silver medalist, Japanese skater Yuma Kagiyama, by about 5 points.

Qualifying to the 2019–20 Junior Grand Prix Final in Torino, Samsonov placed second in the short program despite falling on his opening triple Axel.  After several minor jump errors in the free skate, he placed fourth in that segment, and won the bronze medal overall.  He described himself as "unhappy" with how he had performed.

Competing at the senior-level 2020 Russian Championships for the first time, Samsonov was seventh in the short program after stepping out of his quad Lutz and falling on his triple Axel.  Fifth in the free skate, he rose to sixth place overall. Samsonov later competed at the 2020 Russian Junior Championships, where he placed second in both the short and free programs but finished first overall due to a large ordinal gap from free skate winner Andrei Mozalev, earning him his second junior national title. Due to this result, he was initially named to the team for the 2020 World Junior Figure Skating Championships; however, on 28 February 2020, it was announced that he'd withdrawn from the competition due to joint problems caused by growth. He was replaced at the event by Ilya Yablokov. Samsonov later clarified that his withdrawal from the event was due to pain associated with Osgood-Schlatter disease.

2020–2021 season 
Samsonov missed the first half of the season due to treatment for Osgood-Schlatter disease, including time spent with a specialist in Germany. Samsonov returned to training in October. He competed at the 2021 Russian Junior Championships where he placed seventh overall.

2021–2022 season 
Samsonov withdrew from the senior Russian test skates, citing medical reasons. He subsequently withdrew as well from the 2021 Skate America, which was scheduled to be his senior Grand Prix debut.

Records and achievements 
 Set the junior-level men's short program record (87.33 points), free skating record (163.18 points) and combined total record (250.51 points) at 2019 JGP Poland. Free skating and combined total records were later surpassed by Shun Sato at the 2019–20 Junior Grand Prix Final. Short program record has later been surpassed by Ilia Malinin at the 2022 Junior Worlds, although Samsonov still holds the record for Technical Element Scores of the short program.

Programs

Competitive highlights 

GP: Grand Prix; JGP: Junior Grand Prix

Detailed results

Junior level

References

External links 
 

! colspan="3" style="border-top: 5px solid #78FF78;" |World Junior Record Holders

2005 births
Russian male single skaters
Living people
Figure skaters from Moscow
Figure skaters at the 2020 Winter Youth Olympics